The Șugău is a left tributary of the river Iza in Romania. It discharges into the Iza near Vadu Izei.

References

Rivers of Romania
Rivers of Maramureș County